The subdural space (or subdural cavity) is a potential space that can be opened by the separation of the arachnoid mater from the dura mater as the result of trauma, pathologic process, or the absence of cerebrospinal fluid as seen in a cadaver. In the cadaver, due to the absence of cerebrospinal fluid in the subarachnoid space, the arachnoid mater falls away from the dura mater. It may also be the site of trauma, such as a subdural hematoma, causing abnormal separation of dura and arachnoid mater. Hence, the subdural space is referred to as "potential" or "artificial" space.

See also
 Epidural space
 Subarachnoid space
 Meninges
 Subdural hematoma

References

External links
 
 

Meninges